Etlingera crispata is a monocotyledonous plant species described by Lim Chong Keat. Etlingera crispata is part of the genus Etlingera and the family Zingiberaceae. No subspecies are listed in the Catalog of Life.

References 

crispata